Harriston is an unincorporated community located in Jefferson County, Mississippi, United States.

History
Harriston was named for General Nathaniel H. Harris, who served as the first president of the Vicksburg & New Orleans Railroad. James Lowe and E. R. Jones were the first settlers of Harriston.

Harriston is located on the former Illinois Central Railroad. The community was incorporated in 1886 and had a post office that first opened in 1885. The town was disincorporated and the post office ceased operations at an unknown date.

Harriston was affected by a smallpox epidemic in the spring of 1896.
The community was placed under quarantine in 1898 due to a yellow fever epidemic.

References

Unincorporated communities in Jefferson County, Mississippi
Unincorporated communities in Mississippi